The following is a complete discography of every album and single released by Finnish pop/pop rock music artist Hanna Pakarinen.

Albums

Singles

Music videos

Featured musician
2007 feat. Eicca Toppinen the song Black Ice from Musta Jää (Black Ice) soundtrack.
2007 feat. Michelle Darkness the song Love Will Tear Us Apart from the Album Brand new Drug.
2008 feat. Apocalyptica the song S.O.S (Anything But Love) live at Emma-gaala on 8 March 2008.

Album track listings

When I Become Me (2004)
 "When I Become Me" (Sarin) - 5:03
 "Run" (Elofsson/Thornally/Venge/Wennerberg) - 3:12
 "Fearless" (Finneide/Rydningen/Ziggy) - 3:21
 "How Can I Miss You" (Röhr/Swede) - 3:59
 "Ejected" (Asikainen) - 3:42
 "Love's Run Over Me" (Asikainen) - 4:44
 "Don't Hang Up" (Nylén/Rose) - 3:51
 "Save My Life Tonight" (Fridh/Leonard) - 4:25
 "Sorry" (Björk/Malm/Eklund) - 3:46
 "Heaven" (Adams/Vallance) - 3:53
 "Superhero" (Finneide/Eide) - 3:42
 "Love Is Like A Song" (Elofson/Kolehmainen/Lipp) - 4:02

Stronger (2005)
 "Out Of Tears" (Aldeheim/Leonard) - 3:25
 "Stronger Without You" (Landin/Larsson/Junior) - 3:27
 "Wasted" (Elofson/Kvint/Lindvall) - 3:32
 "Falling Again" (Eklund/Björk/Malm) - 3:42
 "Tears In Your Eyes" (Eriksson/Molin/Funemyr) - 3:55
 "We Don't Speak" (Hansson) - 3:41
 "Damn You" (Ringqvist/Gibson) - 4:17
 "Kiss Of Life" (Johansson/Lipp) - 4:00
 "Paralyzed" (Eriksson/Björk) - 3:57
 "One Way Or The Other" (Björk/Eklund/Krabbe) - 3:18
 "Run (Acoustic Studio Jam 2005)" (Elofsson/Thornally/Venge/Wennerberg) - 3:56 [Bonus Track]

Lovers (2007)
 "It Ain't Me" (Magnusson/Rämström/Vuorinen) - 3:35
 "Go Go" (Lofts/Wermerling) - 3:03
 "Leave Me Alone" (Vuorinen/Huttunen/Pakarinen) - 3:34
 "Tell Me What To Do" (Kurki/Pakarinen) - 3:53>
 "You Don't Even Know My Name" (Laine/Vuorinen) - 3:43
 "Heart Beating Steady" (Kurki/Pakarinen) - 3:24
 "Tears You Cry" (Korkeamäki/Kettunen) - 3:05
 "Free" (Kurki/Pakarinen) - 3:33
 "It Ain't Gonna Happen" (Korkeamäki/Pakarinen/Kettunen) - 3:09
 "Lovers" (Laiho/Kurki/Pakarinen) - 3:48
 "Hard Luck Woman" (Rake) - 4:18
 "Stronger Without You" (Landin/Larsson/Junior) - 3:27 [Bonus Track]
 "Love Is Like A Song" (Elofson/Kolehmainen/Lipp) - 4:02 [Bonus Track]

Love In A Million Shades (2009)
 "Almost Real"
 "Shout It Out Loud"
 "When We Hear Halleluja"
 "Liar"
 "Rescue Me"
 "A Thief That Holds My Heart"
 "Love In A Million Shades"
 "Make Believe"
 "Lover Friend Or Foe"
 "Maybe It's A Good Thing"
 "Better Off Alone" (iTunes Bonus Track)

References

External links
 Official website
 Official MySpace

Discographies of Finnish artists
Pop music discographies